Raymond Mhlaba Local Municipality is a local municipality of South Africa. It was established after the August 2016 local elections by the merging of Nkonkobe and Nxuba local municipalities.

Towns/villages in the municipal area
 Fort Beaufort (seat)
 Adelaide
 Alice
 Balfour
 Bedford
 Healdtown township
 Hogsback
 Katberg
 Middledrift
 Seymour

Politics 

The municipal council consists of forty-five members elected by mixed-member proportional representation. Twenty-three councillors are elected by first-past-the-post voting in twenty-three wards, while the remaining twenty-two are chosen from party lists so that the total number of party representatives is proportional to the number of votes received. In the election of 1 November 2021 the African National Congress (ANC) won a majority of thirty-three seats on the council.
The following table shows the results of the election.

References

Local municipalities of the Amatole District Municipality